The Dreaming is the ninth and the second English-language studio album by the South Korean boy group Monsta X. It was released and distributed by Intertwine on December 10, 2021.

Background
The album was announced on October 21, following the release of the single "One Day" on September 10. There are ten tracks on the album, including "One Day" and nine new English tracks. Music video for the track "You Problem" was released alongside the album on December 10.

In December, the group released Monsta X: The Dreaming, a documentary film and concert film that follows the process of creating the album and the performances of the songs used in the film, including the interviews with all the members and footages of their history.

Critical reception

The Dreaming was met with generally favorable reviews from its critics. At Metacritic, which assigns a normalized rating out of 100 to reviews from mainstream publications, the album received a weighted average score of 71 based on 5 reviews, indicating "generally favorable reviews".

Sophia Simon-Bashall, writing for The Line of Best Fit, said that the album was a combination of the signature sound of Monsta X's Korean releases with the group's first English-language album All About Luv, focusing on "bringing their energy and creativity to the songs, and showcasing the spectacular vocals they deserve to be known for". Overall, it was a diverse album that "showcases new sides of Monsta X whilst also meeting the ideas and feelings that fans look forward to".

Ben Devlin of musicOMH said that the album presents the "imperial core of its own music in recontextualised form", while the group displays "versatility, emotion and style" on their second English-language album.

While reviewing the album for NME, Ruby C wrote that the group shows different sides to themselves on their "stellar retro-themed sophomore English album", focusing on "disco and synth-pop", two genres that aren’t typically associated with Monsta X, who are much better known for their "powerful, hard-hitting tunes", immersing themselves in "retro sounds and vibes". The "chameleon-like versatility" of the group is what showed in this album.

Tim Chan described the album for Rolling Stone as "an homage to boy-band culture, with Nineties-style harmonies, slick choruses, and head-bopping beats", that also "showcases the group's versatility, mixing synth beats and EDM with indie pop, rock, and even traces of New Jack Swing".

Listicles

Commercial performance
The album debuted at number 21 on the US Billboard 200 with 31,400 album-equivalent units, including 29,500 pure album sales on its first week. It is Monsta X's second entry on the said chart. It also succeeded in charting on the said chart for two weeks in a row.

Track listing

Charts

See also
 List of K-pop albums on the Billboard charts
 List of K-pop songs on the Billboard charts

Notes

References

2021 albums
Monsta X albums
BMG Rights Management albums